Luyatrechus cuelapensis is a species of beetle in the family Carabidae, the only species in the genus Luyatrechus. There are currently 0 confirmed observations of Luyatrechus.

References

Trechinae